Stony Creek flows into the Black River near Deer River, New York.

References 

Rivers of Lewis County, New York